Second Brother is a novel by the American writer David Guy set in 1960s Pittsburgh, Pennsylvania.

It tells the coming-of-age story of Henry Wilder who must measure himself in the shadow of his older brother, a star athlete and scholar.

References

1985 American novels
Novels set in Pittsburgh
Fiction set in the 1960s